Events from the year 1992 in Croatia.

Incumbents
President: Stjepan Mesić
Prime Minister: Franjo Gregurić (until 12 August), Hrvoje Šarinić (starting 12 August)

Events
7 January – A European Community Monitor Mission helicopter is downed by the Yugoslav Air Force near Novi Marof, killing five.
13 January – Croatia is officially recognized by the Holy See.
15 January – Croatia is officially recognised by 19 European countries.
 17 January – Croatian Olympic Committee is officially recognized by the International Olympic Committee.
17 February – Croatia is officially recognized by the Russian Federation.
17 March – Croatia is officially recognized by Japan.
7 April – Croatia is officially recognized by the United States.
16 April – Croatia is officially recognized by Israel.
27 April – Croatia is officially recognized by China.
22 May – Croatia is admitted to the United Nations.
August 2 – Parliamentary and presidential elections held in conjunction.

Arts and literature

Sport
July 25 – 1992 Summer Olympics in Barcelona opened, with Croatia competing as an independent country for the first time. Croatian athletes win 1 silver and 2 bronze medals in basketball and tennis.
February 29 – First season of the newly established Prva HNL kicked off.
March 24 – First edition of the Croatian Cup launched.

Births
January 10 – Šime Vrsaljko, footballer.
April 25 – Kim Daniela Pavlin, swimmer.
March 5 – Dario Župarić, footballer.
March 25 – Borna Rendulić, ice hockey forward.
April 17 – Mislav Komorski, footballer.
May 6 – Karla Šitić, swimmer.
June 4 – Dino Jelusić, singer, musician and songwriter.
August 20 – Matej Delač, footballer.
November 7 – Mia Dimšić, singer.

Deaths
April 3 – Ivan Rukavina, soldier and politician (born 1912).
May 31 – Walter Neugebauer, comic book artist (born 1921).
July 14 – Slavko Luštica, footballer (born 1923).
September 3 – Bruno Bjelinski, composer (born 1909).
November 27 – Ivan Generalić, painter (born 1914).
December 18 – Vojin Bakić, sculptor (born 1915).

References

 
Years of the 20th century in Croatia
Croatia, 1992 In